Pedro Tenorio may refer to:

Pedro Tenorio (archbishop) (c.1328–1399), Spanish prelate
Pedro Pangelinan Tenorio (1934–2018), Northern Mariana Islander politician
Pedro Agulto Tenorio (born 1941), Northern Mariana Islander politician
 (1953–2021), Spanish poet
 (born 1954), Mexican botanist

See also
Pedro Silva y Tenorio (died 1479), bishop of Lugo, Ourense and Badajoz